Madurantakam railway station is a railway station in Maduranthakam, a municipal town and a taluk headquarters in the Chengalpattu district of Tamil Nadu, India. It belongs to the Chennai railway division and is officially coded as MMK.  The station is one of the major stations on the South line of the Chennai Suburban Railway and handles both regular and suburban traffic. It is connected to several parts of South India namely Chennai, Salem, Thiruvananthapuram etc.

References

Chennai railway division
Railway stations in Kanchipuram district